Radio 1's Live Lounge: Volume 2 is a collection of live tracks played on Jo Whiley's Radio 1 show. The album is the second in a series of Live Lounge albums. It consists of both covers and the bands' own songs. The album was released on 22 October 2007.

Track listing

Disc 1
 Foo Fighters - "Times Like These"
 Amy Winehouse - "Valerie" (originally by The Zutons)
 Biffy Clyro - "Umbrella" (originally by Rihanna)
 Nelly Furtado - "Maneater"
 The Fratellis - "Chelsea Dagger"
 KT Tunstall - "The Prayer" (originally by Bloc Party)
 Mark Ronson feat. Daniel Merriweather - "Stop Me" (originally by The Smiths)
 Klaxons - "Golden Skans"
 Bloc Party - "Say It Right" (originally by Nelly Furtado)
 Kings of Leon - "Fans"
 Editors - "An End Has A Start"
 Reverend and the Makers - "Heavyweight Champion of the World"
 José González - "Heartbeats" (originally by The Knife)
 Calvin Harris - "The Girls"
 The Holloways - "Generator"
 The Pigeon Detectives - "Girlfriend" (originally by Avril Lavigne)
 Avril Lavigne - "The Scientist" (originally by Coldplay)
 The Gossip - "Standing in the Way of Control"
 Paolo Nutini - "Rehab" (originally by Amy Winehouse)
 Robyn - "With Every Heartbeat"

Disc 2
 Arctic Monkeys - "You Know I'm No Good" (originally by Amy Winehouse)
 Mika - "Grace Kelly"
 James Morrison - "You Give Me Something"
 Thirty Seconds to Mars - "Stronger" (originally by Kanye West)
 Keane - "Dirrtylicious" (originally by Christina Aguilera/Destiny's Child)
 Corinne Bailey Rae -  "Sexyback" (originally by Justin Timberlake)
 Jack Peñate - "Second, Minute or Hour"
 The Fray - "Hips Don't Lie" (originally by Shakira)
 Maroon 5 - "Makes Me Wonder"
 The View - "Same Jeans"
 The Enemy - "Hung Up" (originally by Madonna)
 Kasabian - "Empire"
 The Zutons - "Valerie"
 Damien Rice - "Cannonball"
 Maxïmo Park - "I'm Gonna Be (500 Miles)" (originally by The Proclaimers)
 Dizzee Rascal - "Fix Up, Look Sharp"
 The Streets - "Never Went to Church"
 Elbow - "Forget Myself"
 Natasha Bedingfield - "Chasing Cars" (originally by Snow Patrol)
 Coldplay - "Yellow"

See also
Live Lounge
Radio 1's Live Lounge
Radio 1's Live Lounge – Volume 3
Radio 1's Live Lounge – Volume 4
Radio 1's Live Lounge - Volume 5
Radio 1: Established 1967

External links
Radio 1's Live Lounge – Volume 2 on Myspace

Live Lounge
2007 compilation albums
Covers albums
2007 live albums